The 2010 Liga Premier, also known as the TM Liga Premier for sponsorship reasons, is the seventh season of the Liga Premier, the second-tier professional football league in Malaysia.

The season was held from 11 January and concluded on 23 July 2010. 

During the 2010 season, Harimau Muda, which is the national feeder project team was split into two different team where Harimau Muda A went to a training camp in Zlaté Moravce, Slovakia for 8 months while Harimau Muda B competed as Harimau Muda in the remaining fixtures of 2010 Liga Premier season.

The Liga Premier champions for 2010 season was Felda United. The champions and runners-up were both promoted to 2011 Liga Super.

Teams

Below are the list of clubs which compete in this season competition.

  ATM
  Felda United
  Harimau Muda
  Malacca
  MP Muar¹
  PDRM²
  PKNS
  Pos Malaysia¹
  Sabah
  Sarawak
  Shahzan Muda
  USM¹

¹ - promoted from Liga FAM² - relegated from Liga Super

Stadia

League table

Season statistics

Top goalscorers

References

Malaysia Premier League seasons
2
Malaysia
Malaysia